Ernest Knaebel (June 14, 1872 – February 19, 1947) was an American lawyer and the eleventh reporter of decisions of the United States Supreme Court, serving from 1916 to 1944. He retired on January 31, 1944 because of ill health, dying three years later.

Born West Boxford, Massachusetts, Knaebel was a graduate of Yale University, receiving his A.B. in 1894, his LL.B. in 1896, and his LL.M. in 1897. He practiced law in New York City in 1898 but soon moved to Denver, Colorado. He practiced law there until 1902, when he was named United States Attorney, serving until 1907.  In that year he went to Washington, D.C., where he was a special assistant to the United States Attorney General until 1911 and then Assistant Attorney General from 1911 to 1916. While at the United States Department of Justice, he specialized in cases involving the public lands and Indian matters. He became reporter in 1916 and during his tenure, the Government Printing Office took over publication of the United States Reports; previously private printers had issued them.

Some of Knaebel's official correspondence and other personal papers are housed with the Knaebel Family Papers collection at the American Heritage Center of the University of Wyoming and available for research.

References

1872 births
1947 deaths
People from Boxford, Massachusetts
Colorado lawyers
New York (state) lawyers
United States Assistant Attorneys General for the Environment and Natural Resources Division
Reporters of Decisions of the Supreme Court of the United States
Yale Law School alumni